Brackley Gate is a hamlet in the Erewash district, in Derbyshire, England. It forms part of the civil parish of Morley. It is located northeast of Derby, southeast of Belper, west of Ilkeston, south of Ripley, and southwest of Heanor. 

It lies at the end of a dead-end road and consists of houses and farms. It is surrounded by open countryside and the nearby Bluebell Woods.

References

Hamlets in Derbyshire
Borough of Erewash